Sangiin Dalai Lake is a salt water lake in northern Mongolia, located at the border between the Tsagaan-Uul, Shine-Ider, and Bürentogtokh sums of Khövsgöl aimag, and the Ikh-Uul sum of Zavkhan aimag. It is surrounded by mountains, hills, and rocks. The 8.4  Bolnai earthquake occurred nearby on July 23, 1905.

References 

Lakes of Mongolia
Khövsgöl Province
Saline lakes of Asia